Rico Krahnert is a German television production manager and former figure skater who competed for East Germany. He is the 1988 Golden Spin of Zagreb champion, the 1988 Karl Schafer Memorial silver medalist, and a two-time East German national medalist (silver in 1988, bronze in 1989).

Krahnert represented East Germany at the 1987 World Junior Championships in Kitchener, Ontario, Canada, and 1988 European Championships in Prague, Czechoslovakia. He belonged to SC Karl-Marx-Stadt (Chemnitz).

Krahnert has worked as a production manager for German television shows.

Competitive highlights

References 

20th-century births
German male single skaters
Living people
Sportspeople from Chemnitz
Year of birth missing (living people)